Exeter Book Riddle 33 (according to the numbering of the Anglo-Saxon Poetic Records) is one of the Old English riddles found in the later tenth-century Exeter Book. Its solution is accepted to be 'Iceberg' (though there have been other proposals along similar lines). The most extensive commentary on the riddle is by Corinne Dale, whose ecofeminist analysis of the riddles discusses how the iceberg is portrayed through metaphors of warrior violence but at the same time femininity.

Text and translation 
As edited by Craig Williamson and translated by Corinne Dale, the riddle reads:

Editions 

 Krapp, George Philip and Elliott Van Kirk Dobbie (eds), The Exeter Book, The Anglo-Saxon Poetic Records, 3 (New York: Columbia University Press, 1936), https://web.archive.org/web/20181206091232/http://ota.ox.ac.uk/desc/3009.
 Williamson, Craig (ed.), The Old English Riddles of the Exeter Book (Chapel Hill: University of North Carolina Press, 1977), no. 31.
 Muir, Bernard J. (ed.), The Exeter Anthology of Old English Poetry: An Edition of Exeter Dean and Chapter MS 3501, 2nd edn, 2 vols (Exeter: Exeter University Press, 2000).
 Foys, Martin et al. (eds.) Old English Poetry in Facsimile Project, (Madison, WI: Center for the History of Print and Digital Culture, 2019-). Online edition annotated and linked to digital facsimile, with a modern translation.

Recordings

 Michael D. C. Drout, 'Riddle 33', performed from the Anglo-Saxon Poetic Records edition (25 October 2007).

External links 

 Britt Mize, 'Commentary for Riddle 33', The Riddle Ages (22 January 2015).

References 

Riddles
Old English literature
Old English poetry